David Drake (born 1945) is an author of science fiction and fantasy literature.

David Drake may also refer to:

 Dave Drake (1918–1995), American football coach in the United States
 David Drake (actor) (born 1963), author and performer of The Night Larry Kramer Kissed Me
 David Drake (chef), chef and restaurateur in New Jersey
 David Drake (potter) (c. 1801–c. 1870s), African-American potter 
 David W. Drake (1834–1909), farmer, musician and the founder of the Stonewall Brigade Band
 David Drake (died 1922), Australian shipbuilder, see David Drake Limited